Mohamed Ahmed Hilal (July 28, 1937 – March 23, 2014) was an Egyptian engineer, an expert in the manufacture of the mechanical engines of vehicles, tractors and heavy equipment. He was the main expert in the expansion project on the waters of the High Dam in the 1960s.

Birth and education 
Hilal was born on July 28, 1937, in Tanta. When he turned 8 years old, he had a tendency towards the components of vehicles. Hilal graduated from Tanta Mechanical Secondary School in 1956.

Positions 
Member of the Federation of Egyptian Industries in Egypt.
Member of the Chamber of Engineering Industries in Egypt.
Member of the Industries Development and modernization in Egypt.
Former member of the Union Group of 'Chemico' factories in Germany.
Accredited member of the Research Laboratory of Interigence.

References 

1937 births
2014 deaths
Egyptian civil engineers
People from Tanta